John Adams High School (H.S. 480; often referred to locally as John Adams) is a public high school in the Ozone Park neighborhood of Queens, New York City. Planning for the school began in 1927 and classes commenced in September 1930. At around the same time the city built several other high schools from the same plans, including Samuel J. Tilden High School, Far Rockaway High School, Abraham Lincoln High School, Bayside High School, and Grover Cleveland High School.

As of the 2014–15 school year, the school had an enrollment of 2,622 students and 169.7 classroom teachers (on an FTE basis), for a student–teacher ratio of 15.5:1. There were 2,061 students (78.6% of enrollment) eligible for free lunch and 251 (9.6% of students) eligible for reduced-cost lunch.

Facilities
John Adams has three floors and a basement. The basement contains the cafeteria, locker rooms, weight-training room, a swimming pool, numerous classrooms, and a Northwell-LIJ School Based Health Center that opened in 2015. The campus of John Adams is roughly six by three city blocks, with baseball, tennis, track, and football fields behind the school. The school also has three gymnasiums. There is also a library, an auditorium, a Virtual Enterprise Room which is a simulated business class, and several computer and science labs throughout all three floors.

Academics

 Grade levels: 9 to 12
 Ethnicity:
4% White 28% Black 37% Hispanic 28% Asian/Pacific Islander.
 Gender %: 52.8 Male, 47.2 Female
 Attendance: 79.9%
 Graduation rate: 53.6%.
 6-year graduation rate: 67.2% as of 2009–2010.
 College enrollment: 42.8%
 Current School Grade: John Adams recently received a [D] from the Board of Education. - 2009–2010.

Special programs
 The school offers specialized programs in vision care as well as medical and dental technology.
 Taking single sessions of math and English also frees up more time for students to enjoy electives and Advanced Placement courses.
 The school offers College Now, a program run by CUNY offering accredited college courses on site at the high school.
 The school has "collaborative team teaching" (CTT) classes, where two teachers work with a group of special- and general education students. (Laura Zingmond, October 2005)
 All incoming freshman may take classes the summer before and after the 9th grade, which means that they can start the 10th grade with as many as 19 of the 44 credits required for graduation.
 For older students who are at risk of dropping out, there is the PM program—an afternoon session designed to deliver instruction of core subjects in a single classroom environment.
 The school offers day and nighttime GED (General Equivalency Diploma) programs and vocational training. Vocational training is handled off-site.
 The school offers special ed for those with learning challenges.

Notable people

Alumni  
 Eddie Buczynski, prominent Wiccan and gay activist. He attended from 1962 until dropping out in 1964, largely because of the bullying that he had faced at the school.
 Jimmy Breslin, acclaimed columnist for the New York Herald Tribune, the Daily News, the New York Journal American, Newsday, and other venues and author of numerous books. He is also the winner of the Pulitzer Prize for Commentary. 
 Steve Cangialosi, play-by-play voice of the New Jersey Devils on MSG Plus and the New York Red Bulls on the MSG Network.
 Mortimer Caplin, Internal Revenue Service commissioner, law professor and tax attorney
 Jackie Gleason, American actor.    
 Keith Gottfried, former General Counsel and Chief Legal Officer of the U.S. Department of Housing and Urban Development and a senior official in the administration of President George W. Bush, is a 1983 graduate and the former Editor-in-Chief of the school's newspaper, The Campus.
 Jack Lord (John Joseph Patrick Ryan), American actor, director and the star of the long-running TV show "Hawaii Five-O," (the original version from the 1960s) .
 Richard (Dick) Parsons, International business leader, former CEO of Time-Warner, Citi-Bank, General-Consul to Vice President Nelson Rockefeller, Presidential Advisor.
 Bernadette Peters, American actress
 Joseph Pintauro, American playwright, novelist and poet
 Jermaine Turner, American professional basketball player
 Jason Wingreen, American actor who was the original voice of Boba Fett in The Empire Strikes Back.
 Joseph Wiseman, American actor. 
 Chester Riley, American actor, editor, and composer.
 Nick Santamaria, Mike Mincelli and Vinnie Narcardo, founding members of The Capris vocal group. 
Their most famous Doo Wop recording was "There's a Moon Out Tonight".

Former teachers
 Lenny Schultz, acclaimed television comedian and stand-up comic who taught physical education at John Adams High School while at the same time appearing on television shows such as the Tonight Show, Late Night With David Letterman, the Merv Griffin Show, NBC's Laugh-In (TV series) (1977), Blansky's Beauties (TV series) (1977), Ball Four (TV series) (1976), The Pink Panther Laugh and a Half Hour and a Half Show (TV series) (1976-1977), and Drawing Power (a kid's Saturday morning TV series) (1980)
 Bob Sheppard, New York Yankees announcer (English teacher and Chairman of the Speech Dept.)

See also
List of high schools in New York City
List of school districts in New York

References

External links
 John Adams High School at schools.nyc.gov

Public high schools in Queens, New York

Ozone Park, Queens